The twelve Romanesque churches of Cologne are twelve landmark churches in the Old town (Altstadt) of Cologne, Germany. All twelve churches are Catholic.

Churches 
The twelve churches are1: 
 St. Andreas in Altstadt-Nord, est. 974
 St. Aposteln in Altstadt-Nord, est. 9th century
 St. Cecilia's in Altstadt-Süd, est. 9th century
 St. Georg in Altstadt-Süd, est. 11th century
 St. Gereon in Altstadt-Nord, est. before 612
 St. Kunibert in Altstadt-Nord, est. 1247
 St. Maria im Kapitol in Altstadt-Süd, est. 690
 St. Maria Lyskirchen in Altstadt-Süd, est. 948
 Great St. Martin in Altstadt-Nord, est. 10th century
 St. Pantaleon in Altstadt-Süd, est. controversial
 St. Severin in Altstadt-Süd, est. 4th century and
 St. Ursula in Altstadt-Nord, est. early 5th century
1sorted alphabetically

Other churches 
Also sponsored by the Förderverein Romanische Kirchen Köln e.V. (Friends of Romanesque Churches of Cologne) are twelve Romanesque churches outside of the Old Town, as well as St Peter's Church (Cologne):

Alt St. Heribert in Deutz
St. Nikolaus in Dünnwald
St. Martinus in Esch
St. Stephan in Lindenthal
St. Severin in Lövenich
St. Brictius in Merkenich
St. Michael in Niederzündorf
Alt St. Katharina in Niehl
St. Martin in Oberzündorf
St. Cornalius in Rath/Heumar
St. Amandus in Rheinkassel
Alt St. Maternus in Rodenkirchen
St. Nikolaus in Westhoven

See also
 Cologne Cathedral 
 German architecture
 Romanesque architecture
 List of regional characteristics of Romanesque churches 
 Romanesque secular and domestic architecture

Literature 

 Hiltrud Kier: Via Sacra zu Fuß, Kölns Städtebau und die Romanischen Kirchen. Bachem Verlag, Köln 2003 (²/2005) .
 Ulrich Krings, Otmar Schwab: Köln: Die Romanischen Kirchen – Zerstörung und Wiederherstellung. Reihe Stadtspuren Bd. 2, Köln, Bachem Verlag, 2007 (712 S. mit CD Chronologie des Wiederaufbaus).
 Sybille Fraquelli: Zwölf Tore zum Himmel. Kinder entdecken: Die Romanischen Kirchen in Köln. J.P. Bachem Verlag, Köln 2007. 
 Hiltrud Kier und Ulrich Krings: Die Romanischen Kirchen in Köln, Köln, 3.Auflage 1986.
 Sabine Czymmek: Die Kölner Romanischen Kirchen, Schatzkunst, Bd. 1, Köln 2008, Bd. 2, Köln 2009 (= Colonia Romanica, Jahrbuch des Fördervereins Romanische Kirchen Köln e. V. Bd. 22, 2007 und 23, 2008)

External links 

 Förderverein Romanische Kirchen Köln e.V. 
 Romanesque churches of Cologne on Sacred Destinations 
 Romanesque churches on Cologne-Tourism 

Tourist attractions in Cologne
Innenstadt, Cologne

Cologne
Cologne
Romanesque churches